9nine (pronounced simply "nine") is a Japanese idol group formed of Uki Satake, Sayaka Nishiwaki, and Hirona Murata. Formed in 2005, they are managed by LesPros Entertainment and signed to SME Records.

History

2005-10: Origin and debut
In September 2005, 9nine was formed of Sayaka Nishiwaki, Uki Satake, Azusa Matsuzawa, Miwako Wagatsuma, Rubi Katō, Marie Ashida, Mai Yoshida, Midori Yamaoka, and Moe Miura. They released their debut single "Sweet Snow" in 2006.

2010-present: Restart and popularity
The band changed its music style from typical idol pop to electropop. The group's 2012 single "Shōjo Traveller" became its first to reach the top 10 on the Oricon Weekly Singles Chart. The self-titled album 9nine, that soon followed, debuted at number 8. On 27 February 2019, it was announced on their official website that the group would be pausing all activities and going on an indefinite hiatus. On 20 May 2019, Kanae Yoshii withdrew from the group and announced retirement from the entertainment industry, leaving only 3 members left in the lineup. On 21 July 2022, Sayaka Nishiwaki announced her withdrawal from the group and from LesPros Entertainment as she transferred to a new agency, but she revealed that she have intention to return to the group in the future. On 7 August 2022, Uki Satake announced that her contract with LesPros expired, but she would remain as a member of the group.

Members

Current members 
Uki Satake
Hirona Murata

Former members 
Sayaka Nishiwaki
Kanae Yoshii
Umika Kawashima
Azusa Matsuzawa
Miwako Wagatsuma
Rubi Katō
Marie Ashida
Mai Yoshida
Midori Yamaoka
Madoka Shimogaki
Moe Miura

Timeline 

Black - hiatus

Discography

Singles

Albums

DVDs / Blu-ray Discs

Digital singles

Notes

References

External links 
  
 Profile at Sony Music
 Reviews: 9nine - Hotexpress

Japanese electropop groups
Japanese pop music groups
Japanese girl groups
Japanese idol groups
Musical groups established in 2005
2005 establishments in Japan
Sony Music Entertainment Japan artists
Musical quintets
Musical groups from Tokyo